Julian Thomas (December 13, 1886 – December 10, 1943) was a Negro league outfielder and pitcher for several years before the founding of the first Negro National League, and in its first few seasons. He played most seasons for the Brooklyn Royal Giants and the New York Lincoln Giants.

Thomas died in 1943 in New York, New York at the age of 56. He is buried at the Flushing Cemetery in New York, NY.

References

External links
 and Baseball-Reference Black Baseball stats and Seamheads

Negro league baseball managers
Brooklyn Royal Giants players
Lincoln Giants players
St. Louis Giants players
People from Powhatan County, Virginia
1886 births
1943 deaths
20th-century African-American people